NK Špansko is a Croatian football club based in the city of Zagreb, founded on 16 February 1958. It used to be one of the strongest second division teams in Croatia. Nowadays (2017), NK Špansko is playing in the third Croatian league.

Colors and club badge
NK Špansko colors are red and white. Red uniforms are usually for home matches.

External links
NK Špansko at Nogometni magazin 

Football clubs in Croatia
Association football clubs established in 1958
Football clubs in Zagreb
1958 establishments in Croatia